Ting Kok is the name of an area and a village in the northeastern part of Hong Kong. It is located on the northern shore of Plover Cove and west of Tai Mei Tuk. Administratively, it is part of Tai Po District.

Administration
Ting Kok is a recognized village under the New Territories Small House Policy. For electoral purposes, Ting Kok is part of the Shuen Wan constituency of the Tai Po District Council. It was formerly represented by So Tat-leung, who was elected in the local elections until October 2021.

History
Ting Kok Village, originally called Ting Kai, was historically a multi-surname Punti village founded before 1688.

Historically, Ting Kok, together with the nearby Hakka villages of Shan Liu, Lai Pik Shan, Lo Tsz Tin, Lung Mei and Tai Mei Tuk belonged to the Ting Kok Yeuk alliance.

In the 19th century, Ting Kok was the centre of the wider San On Roman Catholic missionary district. It was also an established transit point used by missionaries on their way into mainland China. The mission was set up in 1866, and 19 residents were baptised as the first batch of local Catholics.

At the time of the 1911 census, the population of Ting Kok was 669. The number of males was 301.

Built heritage
Built heritage in Ting Kok include:
 Mo Tai Temple. Built before 1785. Dedicated to Kwan Tai aka. Mo Tai. A Grade III historic building since 2010.
 Lee Ancestral Hall. Built in the late 19th century. Not graded. There are more than 10 ancestral halls in the village. Most of them have been modernized.

Flora and fauna
A mangrove covers a coastal area of about seven hectares near Ting Kok Village. It is one of the few sites in Hong Kong where a large population of Lumnitzera racemosa can be found.

Conservation
A part of Ting Kok is within the Pat Sin Leng Country Park, and the Ting Kok wetlands have been declared a Site of Special Scientific Interest since 1985.

References

Further reading
  (A previous version of this paper was presented at a Seminar 'Hong Kong: its people, culture and traditions, the Centre of Asian Studies, University of Hong Kong. 15-16 April 1983)

External links

 Delineation of area of existing village Ting Kok (Tai Po) for election of resident representative (2019 to 2022)
 Press release: "Comprehensive coastal conservation plan introduced for Ting Kok ", October 25, 2012
  
 Antiquities Advisory Board. Historic Building Appraisal. Mo Tai Temple, Ting Kok. Pictures
 Antiquities Advisory Board. Historic Building Appraisal. Lee Ancestral Hall, Ting Kok. Pictures

Tai Po District
Populated places in Hong Kong
Restricted areas of Hong Kong red public minibus
Villages in Tai Po District, Hong Kong